Kogon (until 1935 ) is a district-level city in Bukhara Region in Uzbekistan. It is also the seat of Kogon District, but not part of it.

History 

The city was named Yangi Buxoro (New Bukhara) until 1935.

The city has a railway station, Bukhara-1, serving the city of Bukhara, which is located 12 km from Kogon. In 1990 construction of long-distance trolleybus line Bukhara - Kogon started, but later it was discontinued.

Population 
The town population in 1989 was 48,054.

References

Populated places in Bukhara Region
Cities in Uzbekistan